The 2000 Pop Cola 800s season was the 11th season of the franchise in the Philippine Basketball Association (PBA). Known as Sunkist Orange Juicers in the Commissioner's Cup and Pop Cola Panthers in the Governor's Cup

Draft picks

Transactions

Occurrences
Coach Chot Reyes, whose last coaching stint in the PBA was with Sta.Lucia in 1997, was named the new Pop Cola head coach at the start of the season, he replaces Norman Black, who has moved over to Sta.Lucia Realtors. The Pop Cola coaching staff was completed with the hiring of assistant coaches Binky Favis and former MBA mentor Biboy Ravanes. The team's original choice as Reyes' deputy, Aric del Rosario, choose to concentrate on other fields.

Roster

Elimination round

Games won

References

Pop Cola
Pop Cola Panthers seasons